USCGS may refer to:
 U.S. National Geodetic Survey
 UN/LOCODE:USCGS